Laura Lyn "Lynnie" Greene, also known as Lyn Greene (born May 21, 1954) is an actress, writer, director and producer in the television industry. In addition to her work as a producer, she is possibly best known as an actress for appearing as Young Dorothy in The Golden Girls.

Career
Greene grew up in Newton, Massachusetts. In 1977 she co-starred with another newcomer, Bess Armstrong, in the short-lived CBS comedy On Our Own.

She played a recurring role in The Golden Girls during flashbacks, as a younger version of Bea Arthur's character, Dorothy Zbornak, appearing in four episodes overall.

She originated the role of Emma Goldman in the original off-Broadway production of Stephen Sondheim's Assassins in 1990–91, as well as recreating the role of Comrade Charlotte in the 1987 reworking of Kander & Ebb's Flora the Red Menace.

Writing and producing
Greene was previously a writer and an executive producer on the series Nip/Tuck, BOSS and the ABC series Scoundrels, which is a remake of the New Zealand television series Outrageous Fortune.  She was also a co-executive producer on Showtime's Masters of Sex. Greene most recently served as an executive producer on the 2016 Amazon mini-series The Interestings, based on Meg Wolitzer's novel of the same name; and on the 2018 The Truth About the Harry Quebert Affair, based on Joël Dicker's 2014 novel.

Partial filmography

On Our Own (1977 TV series) (1977–78)
Over the Brooklyn Bridge (1984)
Search for Tomorrow (1985) (credit only)
Cagney & Lacey (1987) (as Lyn Greene)
Baby Boom (American TV series) (1988)
Law & Order (1991) (as Lyn Greene)
The Golden Girls (1987-1991) (as Lyn Greene)
The 5 Mrs. Buchanans (1994)

Sources

1954 births
Actresses from Massachusetts
American musical theatre actresses
American television actresses
Television producers from Massachusetts
American women television producers
American television writers
American women television directors
American television directors
Living people
Actors from Newton, Massachusetts
American women television writers
Writers from Newton, Massachusetts
Screenwriters from Massachusetts
21st-century American women